James B. Rogers is a film director and producer. Rogers was born in Indianapolis, Indiana, where he attended Park Tudor School.

Rogers acted as second unit director for American Pie and went later on to direct American Pie 2 as main director. The film was a box office success and won a few award categories such as in the Teen Choice Awards as well as in the MTV Movie Awards 2002.

Later he went on to direct films such as Demoted, The Pool Boys, and Say It Isn't So. He also acted as producer on several films such as Me, Myself & Irene, There's Something About Mary, and Hall Pass.

Rogers also acted as a second unit director of over 30 films and worked especially close together with the Farrelly Brothers.

References

External links

Year of birth missing (living people)
Living people
American film directors
American film producers
Comedy film directors
American male screenwriters
Place of birth missing (living people)
Park Tudor School alumni